The following is a list of family relations in American football. Please do not add relationships in which members did not make it to a professional sports league. 

Adamle – Tony Adamle (father), Mike Adamle (son)
Adams – Julius Adams (father), Keith Adams (son)
Adams – Sam Adams Sr. (father), Sam Adams Jr. (son)
Adams – George Adams (father), Jamal Adams (son)
Addae – Jahleel Addae, Jahmile Addae (brothers)
Agnew – Ray Agnew Jr. (father), Ray Agnew III (son)
Aldridge – Allen Aldridge Sr. (father), Allen Aldridge Jr. (son)
Alford – Bruce Alford Sr. (father), Bruce Alford Jr. (son)
Anderson – Flipper Anderson (father), Dres Anderson (son)
Atkinson – George Atkinson Jr. (father), George Atkinson III (son)
Ayodele – Akin Ayodele, Remi Ayodele (brothers)
Ayanbadejo – Obafemi Ayanbadejo, Brendon Ayanbadejo (brothers)
Bahr – Chris Bahr, Matt Bahr (brothers)
Bailey – Champ Bailey, Boss Bailey (brothers)
Bakhtiari – Eric Bakhtiari, David Bakhtiari (brothers)
Barber – Ronde Barber, Tiki Barber (twin brothers)
Barber – Marion Barber Jr. (father); Marion Barber III, Dominique Barber (sons)
Belichick – Steve Belichick (father); Bill Belichick (son); Stephen Belichick, Brian Belichick (grandsons)
Bennett – Michael Bennett, Martellus Bennett (brothers)
Berry – Eric Berry, Evan Berry (brothers)
Blackwood – Lyle Blackwood, Glenn Blackwood (brothers)
Blades – Bennie Blades, Brian Blades (brothers), H.B. Blades (son of Bennie)
Blanton − Jerry Blanton (father), Kendall Blanton (son)
Bolden/Pitts – Brandon Bolden and Frank Pitts (grandson and grandfather) 
Bosa/Kumerow – John Bosa (father), Eric Kumerow (brother-in-law), Joey Bosa (son of John, nephew of Eric), Nick Bosa (son of John, nephew of Eric), Jake Kumerow (son of Eric, nephew of John, cousin of Joey and Nick)
Bowden – Bobby Bowden (father); Tommy Bowden, Jeff Bowden, Terry Bowden (sons).
Bradshaw – Terry Bradshaw, Craig Bradshaw (brothers)
Brown – Orlando Brown (father), Orlando Brown Jr. (son)
Brown/Thompkins – Eddie Brown (father), Antonio Brown (son), Kenbrell Thompkins (cousin of Antonio), Marquise Brown (cousin of Antonio)
Burns/McClover – Stanley McClover, Brian Burns (brothers)
Bush – Devin Bush (father), Devin Bush Jr. (son)
Butkus – Dick Butkus (uncle), Luke Butkus (nephew)
Byrd – Gill Byrd (father), Jairus Byrd (son)
Caldwell – Andre Caldwell, Reche Caldwell (brothers)
Carpenter  – Rob Carpenter (father), Bobby Carpenter (son)
Carr/Boyett – David Carr, Derek Carr (brothers); Lon Boyett (uncle)
Carter – Cris Carter (father), Duron Carter (son)
Cash – Keith Cash, Kerry Cash (brothers)
Castille  – Jeremiah Castille (father), Simeon Castille, Tim Castille (sons)
Caterbone – Mike Caterbone, Thomas Caterbone (brothers)
Celek – Brent Celek, Garrett Celek (brothers)
Chickillo – Nick Chickillo (father), Tony Chickillo (son), Anthony Chickillo (grandson)
Chubb – Bradley Chubb, Brandon Chubb (brothers); Nick Chubb (cousin)
Clark – Monte Clark (father), Bryan Clark (son)
Clausen – Casey Clausen, Jimmy Clausen, Rick Clausen (brothers)
Cline – Tony Cline (father); Tony Cline Jr. (son)
Coffman – Paul Coffman (father), Chase Coffman (son)
Colquitt – Craig Colquitt, Jimmy Colquitt (brothers); Britton Colquitt, Dustin Colquitt (brothers, sons of Craig, nephews of Jimmy)
Cook – Dalvin Cook, James Cook (brothers)
Cox – Bryan Cox (father), Bryan Cox Jr. (son)
Cromartie/Rodgers-Cromartie – Antonio Cromartie (cousin of Dominique & Marcus), Dominique Rodgers-Cromartie, Marcus Cromartie (cousin of Dominique & Antonio), Isaiah Rodgers (cousin of Dominique)
Crumpler – Alge Crumpler, Carlester Crumpler (brothers)
Cummings – Ed Cummings (father), Joe Cummings (son)
Cunningham – Sam Cunningham, Randall Cunningham (brothers)
Davis – Vernon Davis, Vontae Davis (brothers)
Dawkins – Brian Dawkins (uncle), Dalyn Dawkins (nephew)
DeOssie – Steve DeOssie (father), Zak DeOssie (son)
Derby – Glenn Derby (uncle), A. J. Derby (nephew)
Detmer – Ty Detmer, Koy Detmer (brothers)
Diggs – Stefon Diggs, Trevon Diggs (brothers)
Dimitroff – Tom Dimitroff (father), Thomas Dimitroff (son)
Dixon – Brian Dixon, Brandon Dixon (twin brothers)
Donelli – Aldo Donelli; Allen Donelli (brothers) 
Dorsett – Tony Dorsett (father), Anthony Dorsett (son)
Edmunds – Ferrell Edmunds (father) Trey Edmunds (brother), Tremaine Edmunds (brother), Terrell Edmunds (brother)
 Edwards – Mario Edwards (father), Mario Edwards Jr. (son)
Ellington – Andre Ellington, Bruce Ellington (cousins)
Ellison – Riki Ellison (father), Rhett Ellison (son)
Elway – Jack Elway (father), John Elway (son)
Fahnhorst – Keith Fahnhorst, Jim Fahnhorst (brothers)
Farmer – George Farmer (father), Danny Farmer (son)
Farr – Mel Farr (father); Mel Farr Jr., Mike Farr (sons)
Fassel – Jim Fassel (father), John Fassel (son)
Fatukasi – Folorunso Fatukasi, Olakunle Fatukasi (brothers)
Fells – Daniel Fells, Darren Fells (brothers)
Fields – Mark Fields (father), Mark Fields II (son)
Flacco – Joe Flacco, Mike Flacco, Tom Flacco (brothers)
Fletcher – Bryan Fletcher, Terrell Fletcher (brothers)
Floyd – Malcolm Floyd, Malcom Floyd (brothers)
Fuller – Vincent Fuller, Corey Fuller, Kyle Fuller, Kendall Fuller (brothers)
Fuller – Devin Fuller, Jordan Fuller (brothers)
Garrett – Jim Garrett (grandfather), Jason Garrett, Judd Garrett, John Garrett (sons), Harry Flaherty Jr. (grandson), Harry Flaherty Sr. (son-in-law)
Gbaja-Biamila – Kabeer Gbaja-Biamila, Akbar Gbaja-Biamila (brothers)
Gaffney – Derrick Gaffney (father), Jabar Gaffney (son)
Geathers – Robert Geathers Sr., Jumpy Geathers (brothers); Robert Geathers Jr., Clifton Geathers, Kwame Geathers (sons of Robert Sr.), Clayton Geathers (son of Jumpy), Jeremy Geathers (cousin of the Geathers')
Gerhart – Toby Gerhart, Garth Gerhart (brothers)
Gilbert – Gale Gilbert (father), Garrett Gilbert (son)
Glasgow – Graham Glasgow, Ryan Glasgow, Jordan Glasgow (brothers)
Gogolak – Pete Gogolak, Charlie Gogolak (brothers)
Golic – Bob Golic, Mike Golic (brothers), Mike Golic Jr. (nephew of Bob, son of Mike)
Gramatica – Martín Gramática, Bill Gramatica (brothers)
Grange – Garland Grange, Red Grange (brothers)
Green – A. J. Green, T. J. Green (cousins) 
Griese – Bob Griese (father); Brian Griese (son)
Griffin – Shaquem Griffin, Shaquill Griffin (twin brothers)
Gronkowski – Rob Gronkowski, Dan Gronkowski, Chris Gronkowski, Glenn Gronkowski (brothers)
Gruden – Jon Gruden, Jay Gruden (brothers)
Hager – Britt Hager (father), Bryce Hager (son)
Hakim – Az-Zahir Hakim, Saalim Hakim (brothers)
Hambrick – Darren Hambrick, Troy Hambrick (brothers)
Hannah – Herb Hannah (father); John Hannah, Charley Hannah (sons)
Harbaugh – Jack Harbaugh (father); John Harbaugh (son), Jim Harbaugh (son); Jay Harbaugh (son of Jim and nephew of John)
Hasselbeck – Don Hasselbeck (father); Matt Hasselbeck, Tim Hasselbeck (sons)
Hennessy – Matthew Hennessy, Thomas Hennessy (brothers)
 Henderson – E.J. and Erin Henderson (brothers)
Heyward – Craig Heyward (father); Cameron Heyward and Connor Heyward (brothers)
Highsmith – Alonzo Highsmith (father), Alonzo Highsmith Jr. (son)
Hilgenberg – Jerry Hilgenberg (father); Wally Hilgenberg (brother); Jay Hilgenberg, Joel Hilgenberg (sons of Jerry)
Hochuli – Ed Hochuli (father); Shawn Hochuli (son) (family of referees)
Holt – Terrence Holt, Torry Holt (brothers)
Horn – Joe Horn (father); Joe Horn Jr. Jaycee Horn (sons)
Huard – Damon Huard, Brock Huard (brothers)
Hutchinson – Chris Hutchsin (father), Aidan Hutchinson (son)
Ihenacho – Carl Ihenacho, Duke Ihenacho (brothers)
Ingram – Mark Ingram Sr. (father), Mark Ingram II (son)
Ismail – Raghib Ismail, Qadry Ismail (brothers)
Jefferson – Shawn Jefferson (father), Van Jefferson (son)
Jenkins – Kris Jenkins, Cullen Jenkins (brothers)
Jerry – John Jerry, Peria Jerry (brothers)
Johnson/Thomas - Keyshawn Johnson (uncle), Michael Thomas (nephew)
Jones – Jerry Jones (father); Jerry Jones Jr., Stephen Jones, Charlotte Jones Anderson (children)
Jones – Julius Jones, Thomas Jones (brothers)
Jones – Robert Jones (father); Cayleb Jones, Vi Jones, Zay Jones (brothers)
Jones-Drew/Ward – Maurice Jones-Drew, T. J. Ward (cousins)
Jordan – Steve Jordan (father), Cameron Jordan (son)
Joseph – Mickey Joseph, Vance Joseph, Sammy Joseph (brothers)
Kalil – Ryan Kalil, Matt Kalil (brothers)
Karras – Lou Karras, Ted Karras, Alex Karras (brothers), Ted Karras, Jr (son of Ted) and Ted Karras III (son of Ted, Jr; grandson of Ted)
Kearse/Buchanon – Jevon Kearse (uncle), Jayron Kearse (nephew), Phillip Buchanon (cousin of Jayron)
Kelce – Jason Kelce, Travis Kelce (brothers)
Kendricks – Mychal Kendricks, Eric Kendricks (brothers)
Kiffin – Monte Kiffin (father), Lane Kiffin (son), Chris Kiffin (son)
Kupp – Jake Kupp (father), Craig Kupp (son), Cooper Kupp (grandson)
Landry – Dawan Landry, LaRon Landry (brothers)
Lattner/Spillane – Johnny Lattner, Robert Spillane (grandfather and grandson)
Leggett – Earl Leggett (father), Brad Leggett (son)
Lindstrom – Chris Lindstrom (son), Chris Lindstrom Sr. (father), Eric Lindstrom (uncle), Dave Lindstrom (uncle)
Little – Larry Little, David Little (brothers)
Lombardi – Michael Lombardi (father); Matt Lombardi, Mick Lombardi (brothers)
Lombardi – Vince Lombardi (grandfather); Joe Lombardi (grandson)
Long – Howie Long (father); Chris Long, Kyle Long (sons)
Lott/Nece – Ronnie Lott (father), Ryan Nece (son)
Luck – Oliver Luck (father), Andrew Luck (son)
Lusk – Herbert H. Lusk, Hendrick Hamilton Lusk, Harold Hollingsworth Lusk, (brothers)
Lynch – Bill Lynch (father), Joey Lynch (son), Kevin Lynch (son)
Lynch/Johnson/Russell – Marshawn Lynch; Josh Johnson, JaMarcus Russell (cousins)
Manning – Archie Manning (father); Peyton Manning, Eli Manning (sons)
Marion – Jerry Marion (father), Brock Marion (son)
Martin – Doug Martin, George Martin (brothers)
Martin – Nick Martin, Zack Martin (brothers)
Mayo – Deron Mayo, Jerod Mayo (brothers)
Mays – Stafford Mays (father), Taylor Mays (son)
Matthews/Niklas – Clay Matthews, Sr. (father); Clay Matthews, Jr., Bruce Matthews (sons), Clay Matthews III, Kevin Matthews, Casey Matthews, Jake Matthews, Mike Matthews (grandsons), Troy Niklas (Bruce Matthews' nephew)
McCaffrey – Ed McCaffrey (father); Max McCaffrey and Christian McCaffrey (sons)
McAlister – James McAlister (father), Chris McAlister (son)
McClendon – Willie McClendon (father), Bryan McClendon (son)
McCourty – Devin McCourty, Jason McCourty (twin brothers)
McCown – Josh McCown, Luke McCown (brothers)
McCutcheon – Lawrence McCutcheon (father), Daylon McCutcheon (son)
McDaniels – Ben McDaniels, Josh McDaniels (brothers)
McDonald – Tim McDonald (father); T. J. McDonald, Tevin McDonald (sons)
McDougle – Jerome McDougle, Stockar McDougle (brothers)
McFadden – Darren McFadden-Reggie Swinton (Cousins)
McKay – John McKay (father), John McKay Jr., Rich McKay (sons)
McKenzie  – Raleigh McKenzie, Reggie McKenzie (twin brothers)
McKinney – Steve McKinney, Seth McKinney (brothers)
McMillan – Ernie McMillan (father), Erik McMillan (son)
McTyer – Tim McTyer (father), Torry McTyer (son)
McVay − John McVay (grandfather), Sean McVay (grandson)
Metcalf – Terry Metcalf (father), Eric Metcalf (son)
Metcalf – Terrence Metcalf (father), DK Metcalf (son)
Michel – Marken Michel, Sony Michel (brothers)
Mike-Mayer – Nick Mike-Mayer, Steve Mike-Mayer (brothers)
Montgomery– Wilbert Montgomery, Cle Montgomery, Tyrone Montgomery, Fred Montgomery (brothers)
Moore – A. J. Moore, C. J. Moore (brothers)
Moorehead – Emery Moorehead (father), Aaron Moorehead (son)
Mora – Jim E. Mora (father), Jim L. Mora (son)
Moss – Eric Moss, Randy Moss (brothers), Thaddeus Moss (son of Randy, nephew of Eric)
Moss – Santana Moss, Sinorice Moss (brothers)
Murray – Kevin Murray (father), Kyler Murray (son)
Nolan – Dick Nolan (father), Mike Nolan (son)
Nassib – Carl Nassib, Ryan Nassib (brothers)
Neal – Mike Neal, Ryan Neal (brothers)
Nesser – Al Nesser, Frank Nesser, Fred Nesser, John Nesser, Phil Nesser, Ted Nesser (brothers), Charlie Nesser (son of Ted)
Newton – Cam Newton, Cecil Newton (brothers)
Ogden – Jonathan Ogden, Marques Ogden (brothers)
Okwara – Julian Okwara, Romeo Okwara (brothers)
Olsen – Merlin Olsen, Orrin Olsen, Phil Olsen (brothers)
Pagano – Chuck Pagano, John Pagano (brothers)
Palmer – Carson Palmer, Jordan Palmer (brothers)
Payton – Eddie Payton, Walter Payton (brothers); Jarrett Payton (son of Walter)
Peko – Domata Peko, Tupe Peko (brothers), Kyle Peko (cousin)
Perkins – Don Perkins (great-uncle), Paul Perkins (great-nephew)
Perriman – Brett Perriman (father), Breshad Perriman (son)
Perry – Michael Dean Perry, William Perry (brothers)
Petrino – Bobby Petrino, Paul Petrino (brothers)
Phillips – Bum Phillips (father), Wade Phillips (son), Wes Phillips (grandson)
Polamalu − Troy Polamalu (nephew), Kennedy Polamalu (uncle)
Pouncey – Maurkice Pouncey, Mike Pouncey (twin brothers)
Pyle/Kumerow – Palmer Pyle (father), Eric Kumerow (son), Jake Kumerow (grandson)
Pyne  – George Pyne II (father), George Pyne III (son), Jim Pyne (grandson)
Quessenberry –  David Quessenberry, Paul Quessenberry, Scott Quessenberry (brothers)
Randle – Ervin Randle, John Randle (brothers)
Reed – Brooks Reed, Lucas Reed (brothers)
Reed/Carter – Jake Reed, Dale Carter (brothers)
Reeder – Dan Reeder (father), Troy Reeder (son)
Reid – Eric Reid, Justin Reid (brothers)
Rice/Matthews – Jerry Rice (father), Jerry Rice Jr. (son); Jordan Matthews (first cousin once removed to Jerry Rice, second cousin to Jerry Rice Jr.)
Richardson – Willie Richardson, Gloster Richardson, Tom Richardson, Ernie Richardson
Ridley – Calvin Ridley, Riley Ridley (brothers)
Rivera – Ron Rivera (uncle), Vincent Rivera (nephew)
Robiskie – Terry Robiskie (father), Andrew Robiskie, Brian Robiskie (sons)
 Robinson – Marcus Robinson (uncle), Demarcus Robinson (nephew)
Rodgers – Aaron Rodgers, Jordan Rodgers (brothers)
Rodgers – Richard Rodgers Sr. (father), Richard Rodgers II (son)
Ryan – Buddy Ryan (father); Rex Ryan, Rob Ryan (twin sons), Seth Ryan (son of Rex and nephew of Rob)
Ryan/McGlinchey – Matt Ryan, Mike McGlinchey (cousins)
Salaam – Sulton Salaam (father); Rashaan Salaam (son)
Sauer – George Sauer (father); George Sauer Jr. (son)
Saul – Bill Saul, Rich Saul, Ron Saul (brothers, Rich and Ron twins)
Schwartz – Geoff Schwartz; Mitchell Schwartz (brothers) 
Selmon – Dewey Selmon, Lee Roy Selmon (brothers)
Sewell – Penei Sewell, Nephi Sewell (brothers), Richard Brown, Isaac Sopoaga (uncles)
Shanahan – Mike Shanahan (father), Kyle Shanahan (son) 
Sharpe – Sterling Sharpe, Shannon Sharpe (brothers)
Sharper – Jamie Sharper, Darren Sharper (brothers).
Shepard – Darrell Shepard and Derrick Shepard (brothers); Sterling Shepard (son of Derrick)
Shula – Don Shula (father); Dave Shula, Mike Shula (sons).
Shuler – Mickey Shuler (father), Mickey Shuler Jr. (son)
Simms – Chris Simms, Matt Simms (brothers); Phil Simms (father)
Slater – Jackie Slater (father), Matthew Slater (son)
Slay/Walker – Darius Slay, Tracy Walker (second cousins) 
Smith – Rod Smith, Jaylon Smith (brothers)
Smith – Malcolm Smith, Steve Smith (brothers)
Spikes – Brandon Spikes, Takeo Spikes (cousins)
St. Brown – Amon-Ra St. Brown, Equanimeous St. Brown
Stoops – Bob Stoops, Mike Stoops, Mark Stoops (brothers)
Stutzmann – Craig Stutzmann, Billy Ray Stutzmann (brothers)
Sudfeld – Nate Sudfeld, Zach Sudfeld (brothers)
Suhey – Steve Suhey (father), Matt Suhey (son)
Surtain – Patrick Surtain (father), Patrick Surtain II (son)
Talbert – Don Talbert, Diron Talbert (brothers)
Talley – Darryl Talley, John Talley (brothers)
Tatupu – Mosi Tatupu (father), Lofa Tatupu (son)
Taylor – Fred Taylor (father), Kelvin Taylor (son)
Trufant  – Desmond Trufant, Isaiah Trufant, Marcus Trufant (brothers)
Tuiasosopo – Manu Tuiasosopo (father), Marques Tuiasosopo (son)
Turk – Matt Turk, Dan Turk (brothers)
Turner – Norv Turner, Ron Turner (brothers), Scott Turner (son of Norv), Cameron Turner (son of Ron)
Tuttle – Perry Tuttle (uncle), Shy Tuttle (nephew)
Upshaw – Gene Upshaw, Marvin Upshaw (brothers)
Urlacher – Brian Urlacher, Casey Urlacher (brothers)
Van Buren – Steve Van Buren, Ebert Van Buren (brothers)
Vereen – Shane Vereen, Brock Vereen (brothers)
Vick/Brooks – Michael Vick, Marcus Vick (brothers); Aaron Brooks (cousin to the Vicks)
Ward – Terron Ward, T. J. Ward (brothers)
Washington – Ted Washington Sr. (father), Ted Washington Jr. (son)
Watkins – Jaylen Watkins, Sammy Watkins (brothers)
Watt – J. J. Watt, Derek Watt, T. J. Watt (brothers)
Westbrook – Brian Westbrook, Byron Westbrook (brothers)
Whitehurst – David Whitehurst (father), Charlie Whitehurst (son)
Wilson – George Wilson (father), George Wilson Jr. (son)
Winfield – Antoine Winfield (father), Antoine Winfield Jr. (son)
Winslow – George Winslow (father); Ryan Winslow (son)
Winslow – Kellen Winslow (father); Kellen Winslow II (son)
Wisniewski – Leo Wisniewski, Steve Wisniewski (brothers), Stefen Wisniewski (son of Leo, nephew of Steve)
Young – Willie Young (father); Rodney Young (son)
Zendejas – Luis Zendejas, Max Zendejas, Joaquin Zendejas (brothers), Marty Zendejas, Tony Zendejas (brothers) (groups of brothers are cousins to each other)
Zimmer – Mike Zimmer (father), Adam Zimmer (son)

References

External links
 Brothers Who played Pro Football

Family relations in American football
American football
Family relations in American football
American football